Altaf Mahmud (23 December 1933 – September 1971) was a musician, cultural activist, and martyred freedom fighter of the Bangladesh Liberation War. He was also a language activist of the Language Movement and composer of "Amar Bhaier Rokte Rangano", the famous song written to commemorate the event.

Early life 
Altaf Mahmud was born in Patarchar village of Muladi Thana under Barisal district. He finished his matriculation from Barisal Zilla School. Mahmud was then admitted to BM College before he went to Kolkata to learn painting at the Calcutta Arts School. Mahmud started singing while he was a school boy. He first learnt music from famous violin player Suren Roy. He learnt to sing gana sangit (people's song), which brought him popularity during that time.

Professional career 
Altaf Mahmud came to Dhaka in 1950 and joined in Dhumketu Shilpi Shongho. Later he became the music director of the institution. In 1956, Mahmud was invited to the Vienna Peace Conference. But he was unable to attend as his passport was confiscated by the government at Karachi. There he stayed until 1963 and took talim of classical music to Ustad Abdul Kader Khan. He also associated with dance director Ghanashyam and music director Debu Bhattacharya. After returning from Karachi to Dhaka, Mahmud worked in 19 different films. Along with the famous Jibon Theke Neya, he also worked in films like Kaise Kahu, Kar Bau, and Tanha. He also remained associated with  politics and different cultural organizations. In addition to his talent in music, Mahmud was also fluent in painting.

Discography

Language Movement and Liberation War 
During 1950 he sang gonoshongit in many places to inspire the activists of the Language Movement. Along with his singing, Mahmud continued to support the movement. He composed the music for the song Amar Bhaier Rokte Rangano in 1969, in Zahir Raihan's film Jibon Theke Neya.

Altaf Mahmud took part in the Bangladesh Liberation War in 1971. He created a secret camp inside his house for the freedom fighters. When the location of this camp was revealed, the Pakistan Army caught him on 30 August 1971. Mahmud was tortured by them, and many other guerrilla fighters like Shafi Imam Rumi were also captured by the Pakistan Army on that day. 

Mahmud and many other fighters were captured and killed in this incident. His patriotic songs, which were broadcast at the Swadhin Bangla Betar Kendra, also inspired the independence fighters during the war.

Awards 
 Ekushey Padak (1977)
 Independence Day Award (2004)

Verdict for killing Altaf Mahmud 
On 18 July 2013, Ali Ahsan Mohammad Mojaheed was found guilty and received a life sentence on the charge related to the killing of Rumi along with Badi, Jewel, Azad and Altaf Mahmud at the army camp set up in Nakhalpara, Dhaka, during the Liberation War.

References

External links
 

1933 births
1971 deaths
People from Barisal District
Bangladeshi composers
20th-century Bangladeshi male singers
20th-century Bangladeshi singers
People killed in the Bangladesh Liberation War
Brojomohun College alumni
Government College of Art & Craft alumni
University of Calcutta alumni
Recipients of the Independence Day Award
20th-century composers
Recipients of the Ekushey Padak in arts